Maangamizi: The Ancient One is a 2001 American / Tanzanian drama film directed by Martin Mhando and Ron Mulvihill and executive produced by Jonathan Demme. It premiered at the Pan African Film Festival and has played in over 55 Film Festivals worldwide. It was the Tanzanian submission for the Academy Award for Best foreign language film, the first, and as of 2021, only, film to be submitted from that country, but was not nominated.

Plot
Dr. Asira is faced with the contrast between Western medicine and traditional East African spirituality when a woman, Samehe, who is admitted to a psychiatric hospital, claims to be under the care of Maangamizi, a mysterious ancestor / shaman.

Cast
 Barbara O. Jones as Dr. Asira (as BarbaraO)
 Amandina Lihamba as Samehe
 Samahani Kejeri as Simba Mbili
 Waigwa Wachira as Dr. Odhiambo
 Ummie Mahfouda Alley as Patient
 Zainabu Bafadhili as Young Samehe
 Chemi Che-Mponda as Nurse Malika
 Mary Chibwana as Patient
 Janet Fabian as Sister Francis
 Stumai Halili as Patient
 Mwanajuma Ali Hassan as Bibi Maangamizi
 Kisaka A. Kisaka as Reverend Waigwa
 Mgeni as Young Asira
 Thecla Mjatta as Zeinabu
 Mona Mwakalinga as Mariamu
 Adam Mwambile as Dr. Moshi
 Evodia Ndonde as Patient

Awards
Maangamizi: The Ancient One won the Golden Dhow at the 1998 Zanzibar International Film Festival. It won the Paul Robeson Award for Best Feature at the Newark Black Film Festival.

See also
 List of Tanzanian submissions for the Academy Award for Best Foreign Language Film

References

Further reading 
Warriors: Spiritually Engaged The Making of Maangamizi by Queenae Taylor Mulvihill
Copyright Gris Gris Films, 2006; Publishing: Lulu Enterprises Inc.; 

 Basaran, Aylin (2022-11). "Filmic Therapeutic Encounters and Resistance: Silence, Forgetting, and Guilt in the Face of Historical Violence". Journal of Humanistic Psychology. 62 (6): 838–852. doi:10.1177/00221678211010013. ISSN 0022-1678.

External links
 Official site
 
 

2001 films
2000s fantasy drama films
American fantasy drama films
English-language Tanzanian films
Swahili-language films
Tanzanian drama films
2001 drama films
2000s English-language films
2000s American films